The Berry Scene is a 1947 collection of comic short stories by the English author Dornford Yates (Cecil William Mercer), featuring his recurring 'Berry' characters.

Plot 
The book consistes of ten short stories, filling in some of the gaps in the earlier books, with a brief prologue recounting an episode of Berry's schooldays. Other characters from Yates's novels, including the Lyvedens (Anthony Lyveden), the Beaulieus (The Stolen March) and Jenny Chandos (She Fell Among Thieves), appear briefly.

Chapters

Critical reception 

In his 1982 biography of Dornford Yates, AJ Smithers described the writing as 'elegant' while noting that certain chronological inconsistencies had by this time crept in to the narrative: "the reader must accept the fact without argument that Jonah bought his first Rolls at the age of sixteen. Readers are not expected to be too clever by half. If they are, they must suffer the consequences." "Mercer had reached a point where such things could not be helped."

References

Bibliography
 

1947 short story collections
Ward, Lock & Co. books
Short story collections by Dornford Yates